Dolores Claiborne is a 1995 American psychological thriller drama film directed by Taylor Hackford and starring Kathy Bates, Jennifer Jason Leigh, Christopher Plummer, and David Strathairn. The screenplay by Tony Gilroy is based on the 1992 novel of the same name by Stephen King. The plot focuses on the strained relationship between a mother and her daughter, largely told through flashbacks, after her daughter arrives to her remote hometown on a Maine island where her mother has been accused of murdering the elderly woman for whom she had long been a care-provider and companion.

Dolores Claiborne was the second major King film adaptation to star Bates in a leading role after Misery (1990) five years earlier. The film was shot in Nova Scotia in 1994. It was a sleeper hit, grossing close to $50 million worldwide on a $13 million budget and little promotion. The film was well-received by critics, with the performances of Bates and Leigh being especially praised. Kathy Bates stated in a retrospective interview that her performance as the titular Dolores was her favorite performance she had ever given. In 2013, Time named the film among the top 10 greatest Stephen King film adaptations.

Plot
In 1995, Dolores Claiborne works as a domestic servant on Little Tall Island in Maine. Dolores has a struggle with her elderly, partially paralyzed employer, Vera Donovan, in her mansion. Vera falls down the staircase and Dolores ransacks the kitchen. She is caught by a mailman, who sees her standing over Vera with a rolling pin, apparently intending to kill her. Vera dies and the police begin a murder investigation.

Dolores' daughter, Selena St. George, is a successful journalist, living in New York City, who battles depression and substance abuse. Selena arrives in town to support her mother, despite her own doubts about Dolores' innocence. Dolores insists she did not kill her employer. Selena finds little sympathy for Dolores, as the entire town believes she murdered her husband, Joe St. George, 18 years earlier. Some of the town's inhabitants harass her by vandalizing her home, taunting her in the street, and driving by her house and screaming at her. Detective John Mackey, who was the chief detective in her husband's murder case, is determined to put Dolores away for life.

Selena also believes Dolores killed her father and has not seen her mother in 15 years. In 1975, Joe was an abusive alcoholic, and one night Dolores had threatened to kill him with a hatchet if he ever harmed her again. Selena, then 13 years old, was unaware her mother was being abused. Dolores went to work as a housemaid for millionaire Vera Donovan to save money to pay for Selena's education. Dolores went to the bank to withdraw her money so Selena and she could flee Joe's abuse. The plan was abandoned, however, when Dolores discovered that Joe had stolen the money from Selena's savings account.

Dolores says Vera threw herself down the staircase and begged Dolores to put her out of her misery. Mackey refuses to believe her, and reveals that Vera has left her entire fortune to Dolores. Mackey informs them the will is eight years old, which nearly convinces Selena her mother is guilty. Dolores eventually tells Selena that before he died, Dolores realized Joe was sexually abusing Selena when he gave her an heirloom locket. Selena has always furiously denied any abuse, and after a fierce argument, she storms out, leaving Dolores to fend for herself.

Back in 1975, Dolores broke down and confessed Joe's abuses to Vera, who remained characteristically cold until Dolores mentioned that he was molesting Selena. Turning unusually sympathetic, Vera implied she killed her own late husband, Jack, who had died in a car accident in Maryland, and engineered it to look like an accident. She said, "Sometimes Dolores, sometimes you have to be a high-riding bitch to survive. Sometimes being a bitch is all a woman has to hold on to." Vera's confession formed a bond between the two women and convinced Dolores to take control of her situation. As a total solar eclipse approached, Dolores  was pointedly given the rest of the day off by Vera, who insinuates that she expects Dolores to use the free time to dispose of Joe, repeating her earlier statement, "Sometimes being a bitch is all a woman has to hang on to."

Dolores and Selena had an argument about Dolores' suspicions regarding Joe's sexual abuse. Selena fled home for the weekend to work at a hotel, where guests had flocked for the eclipse. Joe soon returned from working on a fishing boat, and Dolores offered him a bottle of Scotch to celebrate the eclipse. After Joe got drunk, Dolores revealed she knew he stole from Selena's account and molested his own daughter, then provoked him into attacking her and falling down an old well, leaving him to die as he plunges to the stone bottom.

Selena hears this entire story on a tape left for her by Dolores, who had foreseen her departure. While on the ferry, Selena suddenly uncovers a repressed memory of her father forcing her to give him a handjob. Realizing everything, Selena rushes back to Dolores as she is attending the coroner's inquest. As Mackey makes a case to be sent to a grand jury in an attempt to indict Dolores for murder, Selena arrives and tells him he has no admissible evidence, he is only doing this because of his personal vendetta against Dolores, and that despite an often stormy relationship, Vera and Dolores loved each other. Realizing that the case would likely end with either a dismissal or acquittal, Mackey reluctantly drops the charges. Dolores and Selena reconcile on the ferry wharf before Selena returns to New York.

Cast
 Kathy Bates as Dolores Claiborne
 Jennifer Jason Leigh as Selena St. George
 Ellen Muth as Young Selena
 Taffara Jessica Stella Murray as 5-year-old Selena 
 Judy Parfitt as Vera Donovan
 Christopher Plummer as Detective John Mackey
 David Strathairn as Joe St. George
 Eric Bogosian as Peter
 John C. Reilly as Constable Frank Stamshaw
 Bob Gunton as Mr. Pease 
 Roy Cooper as Magistrate 
 Wayne Robson as Sammy Marchant 
 Ruth Marshall as Secretary
 Weldon Allen as Bartender
 Tom Gallant as Searcher
 Kelly Burnett as Jack Donovan

Production
Dolores Claiborne was filmed in Lunenburg, Mahone Bay, Chester, Stonehurst, and Digby, all in Nova Scotia, Canada.

Themes and interpretations
Though typically classified as a drama and psychological thriller, some critics, such as Roger Ebert, have classified Dolores Claiborne as a horror film,  while it has also been identified as a Gothic romance.

Repression
Film theorist Kirsten Thompson identifies the film as a melodrama, "produced by the repression of specific traumas, [in this case] domestic violence and incest." According to Martha McCaughey and Neal King, the film's use of flashbacks suggest a specific narrative point of view when considering the film's themes of abuse and incest between Dolores, as well as Selena and Joe: "That all the flashbacks save one belong to Dolores tells us that not only are we watching her story; it also tells us of the unavailability of the past to Selena, and of the displacement and repression forced into play by the girl's experience of incest."

The flashback scene in which Selena recalls her father's forcing her to masturbate him on the ferry has been particularly noted by critics: "Here, Selena and the viewer alike come finally to see Joe's transgressions, and by implication, to understand the truth of Dolores' tale. Throughout this scene, the perspective offered by the camera remains firmly focused on the reactions of the victim of the sexual crime."

Feminist interpretation
Dolores Claiborne has been cited as a "self-consciously feminist" film that "combines the melodramatic impulse with the investigative structure of a noir crime thriller and a contemporary feminist consciousness." The film has also been read as an example of a maternal melodrama that features an "idealized mother-figure" who sacrifices the needs of her own for others. In the book Screening Genders,  one scholar considered Dolores Claiborne and Stage Door (1937) to be the only "truly feminist" films made in Hollywood, in that they "don't cop out at the end."

Britt Hayes writes of the main character, "Through Dolores, King poignantly explores the way the world often forces women into a series of compromises, and the way those small compromises have a way of stacking up to an imposing height, backing us into a corner until we have no choice but to become bitches...a woman (a wife, a mother) is emotionally and physically abused to the point where she breaks and feels she has no other option [than to become a bitch]." The three main women in the story – Dolores, Serena, and Vera – each repeat, mutatis mutandis, "Sometimes being a bitch is the only thing a woman has left to hold on to."

Reception

Dolores Claiborne received generally positive reviews from critics. On Rotten Tomatoes it has an 85% rating based on 47 reviews, with an average rating of 6.9 out of 10. The site's consensus states: "Post-Misery Kathy Bates proves to be another wonderful conduit for Stephen King's novels in this patient, gradually terrifying thriller." On Metacritic the film has a rating of 62 out of 100, indicating "generally favorable reviews".

Janet Maslin of The New York Times called it "a vivid film that revolves around Ms. Bates's powerhouse of a performance... Only after the film has carefully laid the groundwork for a story of old wounds and violent mishaps does the anticlimactic truth become apparent." Roger Ebert gave the film three out of four stars and praised the performances of Bates and Leigh, saying: "This is a horror story, all right, but not a supernatural one; all of the elements come out of such everyday horrors as alcoholism, wife beating, child abuse and the sin of pride."

Entertainment Weekly, however, gave the film a negative review, awarding it a D+ rating and saying: "This solemnly ludicrous 'psychological' thriller is like one of Hollywood's old-hag gothics turned into a therapeutic grouse-a-thon – it's Hush...Hush, Sweet Charlotte for the Age of Oprah."

Box office
The movie debuted at number three for the week of March 26, 1995, with $5,721,920. It went on to make $24,361,867 domestically. That ranks it as the 15th-highest grossing film based on a Stephen King novel, unadjusted for inflation. Adjusting for inflation, it ranks as the 17th-highest.

Awards
Kathy Bates and Jennifer Jason Leigh were nominated for the Best Actress and Best Supporting Actress awards at the 22nd Saturn Awards. Ellen Muth also won the Tokyo International Film Festival Award for Best Supporting Actress.

Home video 
Warner Bros. released movie on Blu-ray in November 21, 2017, under the label Warner Archive Collection.

See also
 List of films featuring eclipses

Notes

References

Further reading

External links
 
 
 

1995 films
American psychological drama films
American psychological thriller films
1990s psychological thriller films
1990s mystery films
1990s thriller drama films
1990s English-language films
Films based on works by Stephen King
Films set in Maine
Incest in film
Mariticide in fiction
American mystery films
Films directed by Taylor Hackford
Castle Rock Entertainment films
Columbia Pictures films
Films about dysfunctional families
Films shot in Nova Scotia
Films scored by Danny Elfman
Films with screenplays by Tony Gilroy
1990s feminist films
Films about domestic violence
American feminist films
Films about child sexual abuse
Films set in 1995
Films set in 1975
Films set on islands
1995 drama films
Films about mother–daughter relationships
1990s American films